Morris Zoltan "Morry" Schwartz, AM (born 11 March 1948) is an Australian property developer and publisher based in Melbourne. He is the owner of Black Inc., the publisher of the influential Quarterly Essay, The Monthly and The Saturday Paper.

Early life 
Morry Schwartz was born in 1948 in Vámospércs, Hungary. His parents, Andor and Margaret (Baba) Schwartz, were both Holocaust survivors. Andor’s parents, brother and sister, and extended family were murdered during the Holocaust. Baba herself was a survivor of Auschwitz. He and his parents were smuggled across the border to Germany in 1949 when he was one year old, in order to migrate to the newly established State of Israel, where he spent most of the next nine years. A visit from Baba’s sister, who had also survived the Holocaust and had made her home in Australia, convinced Andor that there were new opportunities on the other side of the world. Schwartz and his parents, along with his younger brother Alan, migrated to Australia to join Baba’s sister. 

After finishing school at the selective Melbourne High, he studied architecture briefly before deciding he didn't have the patience for six years of theory. He dropped out to travel, spending time in Indonesia and Cambodia, before returning to get into the film business.

In 1973, with three friends, Schwartz began a company, Outback Press, the start of his publishing empire. But he also launched a concrete pouring company, Aardvark, which evolved into a property development group, called Pan Urban.

Book and magazine publishing 
In the 1980s he established Schwartz Publishing, mainly publishing American self-help books. Its all-time bestseller was Life's Little Instruction Book with 300,000 copies sold.

In the 1990s Schwartz Publishing set up the Black Inc imprint, publishing since 2001 the Quarterly Essay and, since 2005, The Monthly. On 1 March 2014 he launched The Saturday Paper, and in 2017 Australian Foreign Affairs, a journal discussing foreign policy.

Property development 
In 1974 he moved into the construction and property development industry. His company first named Aardvark was later renamed Pan Urban.

Schwartz is currently the major stakeholder of Pan Urban. Its portfolio includes the St Falls, Silverski and Huski hotels in Falls Creek, Victoria, the Watergate towers in Docklands and the refurbishment of the Melbourne General Post Office. Several of these projects have been designed by his stepdaughter, architect Zahava Elenberg.

In 2009, he set up a real estate website, listing only houses for sale valued at over $1 million.

References

External links
Schwartz Media
Black Inc.

1948 births
Living people
Australian Jews
Australian publishers (people)
Hungarian emigrants to Australia
Hungarian emigrants to Israel
Members of the Order of Australia
Quarterly Essay people
Real estate and property developers
The Monthly people